McLaren is a Formula One racing team, part of the McLaren Group.

McLaren or MacLaren may also refer to:
 McLaren (surname) 
 MacLaren (surname)
 Clan MacLaren, a Scottish clan

Places
 McLaren Flat, South Australia
 McLaren Park, New Zealand
 McLaren Park, San Francisco, California, U.S.
 McLaren Wharf, wharf and precinct in Port Adelaide, South Australia
 MacLaren Youth Correctional Facility in Woodburn, Oregon, U.S.
 The McLaren Building, in Birmingham, England, UK

Organisations
 Maclaren, a manufacturer of baby buggies, strollers and carriers
 McLaren Group, owner of the Formula One racing team
 McLaren Technology Centre, headquarters of the McLaren Group
 McLaren Automotive
 McLaren Applied
 McLaren Health Care Corporation, a health care organization in Michigan, United States
 McLaren Performance Technologies, an automotive engineering company currently owned by Linamar
 J&H McLaren & Co. was a British engineering company that manufactured steam traction engines, stationary engines and diesel engines

Motor vehicles
 McLaren F1, a road-going car
 McLaren MP4-12C, a road-going car
 Mercedes-Benz SLR McLaren, а car by Mercedes-Benz and McLaren Automotive

Other uses
 MacLaren's, a fictional bar in How I Met Your Mother
 McLaren (film), a 2017 documentary about the life and death of Bruce McLaren

See also 

 McLaren Vale (disambiguation)
 Swan and Maclaren, an architectural firm in Singapore
 Maclaurin
 McLaurin